Nicholson House and Inn is a historic inn and tavern located in Millcreek Township, Erie County, Pennsylvania. It was constructed during the years between 1825 and 1835, and is a brick "four over four" building on a stone foundation in the Federal style. Isobella Nicholson designed the twelve room house herself, and financed the building of it with her own savings following the death of her husband John. It measures 52 feet wide and has a gable roof.  The roof overhang is supported by decorative brackets.  It served as a stagecoach stop, inn along the Erie Extension Canal, post office from 1842 to 1857, farm supply and general store, and stop on the Buffalo and Conneaut trolley line.

The Nicholson House has undergone recent remodeling and is currently the home of Escape Game Erie.

It was added to the National Register of Historic Places in 1985.

References

Hotel buildings on the National Register of Historic Places in Pennsylvania
Federal architecture in Pennsylvania
Houses completed in 1827
Buildings and structures in Erie County, Pennsylvania
National Register of Historic Places in Erie County, Pennsylvania
1827 establishments in Pennsylvania